The domestic animals of the Faroe Islands are a result of 1200 years of isolated breeding. As a result, many of the islands' domestic animals are found nowhere else in the world.

Faroe pony 

The Faroe pony is a small but strong pony. In the old days it was used as a work horse, carrying heavy loads, but now it’s mostly used as a child’s riding horse. In the early 1900, a lot of ponies were exported to be used as pit ponies. In the 1960s, there were 5-6 pure ponies left; now, with huge effort, there are 73 ponies.

Faroese cattle 
The Faroese cattle are small, often black or piebald, and is used for milking. Both sexes of the species have horns.

Faroese sheep 

The Faroe sheep is a small and hardy breed. It is one of the Northern European short-tailed sheep and has been on the islands for over 1000 years. The sheep is a huge part of Faroese culture - it is a part of the local cuisine, and might have given the islands their name; Føroyar, the name of the Faroes, is thought to mean "sheep islands." There used to be another sheep breed on the islands, the Lítla Dímun sheep or Dímunarseyðurin, that was smaller and more goat-like in appearance. It lived a feral existence on the island of Lítla Dímun, but all specimens of this breed were shot in the 19th century.

Faroese goose

The Faroese goose is a small goose probably brought to the islands during the settlement of Iceland (Landnám) and is probably the oldest form of tame goose in Europe. It can survive without supplementary feed, but most people give it some food during the winter and during egg laying.

Faroese duck 
The Faroese duck is a small, hardy duck; when slaughtered it typically weighs 3 pounds.

See also
 Fauna of the Faroe Islands

References

Domestic animals
Animal breeds originating in Denmark
Animal breeds by country of origin
Domesticated animals